Daiva Rakauskaitė is a Lithuanian female balloonist.

In 2010 1st European Women's Championships in Alytus, Lithuania Rakauskaitė finished in 13th place. In 2012 and 2015 Rakauskaitė won silver at 2nd FAI Women's European Championships in Frankenthal, Germany and at 3rd Women's European Championships in Drenthe, Netherlands. In 2014 1st FAI Women's World Championships she finished 6th.

References 

Living people
Lithuanian balloonists
Year of birth missing (living people)